Hamed Bismel Nastoh (December 18, 1985 – March 11, 2000) was a Canadian high school student who killed himself by jumping off the Pattullo Bridge due to bullying.

Early life 
Nastoh was born to Afghan parents in Abbotsford, British Columbia. His parents fled Afghanistan in 1984 during the Soviet-Afghanistan War. His mother Nasima, who has a degree in psychology, got a job at Immigration, Refugees and Citizenship Canada, while his father Karim, a professor of geography and history, sold Persian rugs. Nastoh attended Enver Creek Secondary School in Surrey along with his brother Abdullah. Nastoh was described as a smart student who liked horror movies, reading, dancing and music. Nastoh, then 14 years old, was bullied in person. In a note, he mentions to his parents that high school was terrible for him, everyone in his school would call him "gay", "fag", "queer", "four-eyes" and "big-nose" because his average grades were above 90 percent. He left a suicide note saying "I hate myself for doing this to you," he wrote to his parents. "I really, really hate myself, but there is no other way out."

At 5:00 pm, Nastoh's mother, father and younger brother David went outside to hang out with a neighbour. Hamed and his older brother Abdullah were home during the night. One hour later, Abdullah took a shower. Hamed put on his new Tommy Hilfiger jacket, left the house and made his way, probably by bus, to the Pattullo Bridge. When Nastoh arrived at the bridge, he jumped to his death.

Investigation 

When Abdullah got out of the shower, he realized that Hamed had disappeared. He phoned his parents, and their father, Kirim, rushed home to investigate. On finding the note, he phoned the Royal Canadian Mounted Police (RCMP). Hamed did not give any hints about how he killed himself, and the RCMP searched around Nastoh's home.

The day after, police found his body in the Fraser River, just south of the Pattullo Bridge. He wore a blue Nike backpack filled with rocks to weigh himself down. According to the coroner's report, "They were unnecessary." The only noticeable mark was a minor scratch on his nose.

A week before his death, Hamed had attended a suicide awareness talk at Enver Creek Secondary School, given by a mother who had lost her son. In his note, Hamed wrote that he'd given his parents a "hint" when he mentioned that the speaker had said that suicidal people give hints.

Aftermath and impact on schools

Homosexuality issues high school course 
Hamed's suicide from the Patullo Bridge made the Government of British Columbia to introduce the Grade 12 Homosexuality issues course. This course was developed in 2007 and is considered an elective course for Grade 12 high school students.

This course was meant to prevent a trial in court before the British Columbia Human Rights Tribunal, which made the agreement to listen to a gay couples complaints that secondary schools in British Columbia are blameworthy of prejudice by not talking about sexual identities as how the curriculum expects.

As a comeback, the Liberal Party of Canada agreed with the Government of British Columbia in developing this course, which discusses the topic of tolerance, especially how it relates to sexual identities, ethnicity and race. However, the course will not be mandatory in 37 secondary schools in British Columbia that represent over 8,000 students.

Hamed Nastoh's Anti-Bullying Coalition 

Hamed mentioned in his suicide note for the reader to go to all the secondary schools in Surrey. He wanted other students to know that all forms of bullying can have a bad impact on the victim. Listening to his message, Nasima formed Hamed Nastoh's Anti-Bullying Coalition, to raise awareness of bullying in elementary and high schools, and help parents of children suffering from bullying. Nasima has presented Hamed's suicide note and story to numerous schools in British Columbia.

His mother states her message is clear and simple: "Suicide is not the solution." Using her son's suicide note to show how much he suffered in high school before committing suicide, Nasima hopes to give support to teenagers and the community and assure them they are not alone. Nasima said, "Seek help. If you don't talk about it nobody can hear," noting that children and teenagers are afraid of having discussions about being bullied if they notify their parents or teachers. Nasima says that Hamed Nastoh's Anti-Bullying Coalition has given her confidence to overcome her agony and misery.

See also 
 Cyberbullying
 List of suicides that have been attributed to bullying

References

External links 
 
 Hamed Nastoh Memorial Page
 Anti bullying Nasima Nastoh

1985 births
2000 deaths
2000 suicides
Canadian people of Afghan descent
2000 in British Columbia
Bullying and suicide
Deaths by person in Canada
Youth suicides
Victims of cyberbullying
Suicides in British Columbia
Suicides by jumping in Canada